Swyre Head is the highest point of the Isle of Purbeck in Dorset, on the south coast of England.

Although not very high, its relative height is such that it just misses  qualification as a Marilyn. The hill consists of Jurassic Formations and is not part of the extensive Southern England Chalk Formation.

The two Swyre Heads are about four hours walk apart from each other; that is, .

The hill commands extensive views, including west past the Isle of Portland to Dartmoor, and east to the Isle of Wight, as well as north across the Purbeck Hills to Poole Harbour and the other Purbeck Marilyn, Nine Barrow Down. To the west, the folly of Clavell Tower can also be seen.

Set back about 800 metres (half a mile) from the coast, the hill is not on the South West Coast Path, but can be reached easily from the villages of Kingston or Kimmeridge.

Gallery

External links 
 Swyre Head, Kingston walk

Hills of Dorset
Jurassic Coast
Marilyns of England
Corfe Castle